Gilera is an Italian motorcycle manufacturer founded in Arcore in 1909 by Giuseppe Gilera (1887–1971). In 1969, the company was purchased by  Piaggio.

History
In 1935, Gilera acquired rights to the Rondine four-cylinder engine. The first across-the-frame 4-cylinder motorcycle was the racer 1939 Gilera 500 Rondine. This formed the basis for Gilera' s racing machines for nearly forty years. From the mid-thirties, Gilera developed a range of four-stroke engine machines. The engines ranged from 100 to 500 cc, the most famous being the 1939 Saturno. Designed by Giuseppe Salmaggi, the Saturno was inspired by the pre-war Gilera VTEGS 500 cc “Otto Bulloni” yet was quite different due to its unit construction.

After withdrawing from competition in 1957, Gilera changed direction abruptly. They downplayed their hitherto successful line of four-stroke singles and began to focus on motocross and off-road events in association with independent specialist Elmeca. Sales declined through the 1960s and by 1968 the company was in receivership.

In 1969, Gilera became part of the Piaggio group. In 1992, Gilera made a return to the Grand Prix arena and Piaggio continues to produce small-displacement motorcycles with the Gilera name. The famous factory of Arcore was closed in 1993 and now the motorcycles (only scooters) bearing the name Gilera are produced by Piaggio in Pontedera.

Racing history

After World War II, Gilera dominated Grand Prix motorcycle racing, winning the 500 cc road racing world championship six times in eight years. Facing a downturn in motorcycle sales due to the increase in the popularity of automobiles after the war, Gilera made a gentleman's agreement with the other Italian motorcycle makers to quit Grand Prix racing after the 1957 season as a cost-cutting measure.

The 1957 500 cc machines on which former World Champion rider Geoff Duke had much success were resurrected in 1963, but with the benefit of newer, upgraded tyre technology of the 1960s were considered still competitive. The team was devised by Duke to challenge the domination of Mike Hailwood on the MV and had early successes with riders Derek Minter and teammate John Hartle at Silverstone, Brands Hatch and Imola, Italy.

In May 1963 Minter suffered serious injuries when racing a Norton at Brands Hatch, and his place in the team for the TT races was taken by Phil Read, who came third to second-place teammate Hartle. The team only raced for one season in selected races.

In 1966 Minter arranged to ride the Gileras at the TT in June, again without success as he crashed on a wet road surface after a rain shower at Brandish Corner during the last practice before race-week, breaking his left wrist which ended his racing for the rest of the race season. The bikes were raced at Brands Hatch later in the year.

European championships

MotoGP World Championship
Gilera won the following World Titles:
 500 cc class:

 250 cc class:

 125 cc class:

MotoGP World Constructors champions
 500 cc class 
 1952, 1953, 1955, 1957

Isle of Man Tourist Trophy
 350 cc class 

 500 cc class

Motorcycles

Racing motorcycles

Historic

Modern

Moped

See also 

List of Italian companies
List of motorcycle manufacturers

References

External links

The Gilera Historical Register

 
Piaggio Group
Motorcycle manufacturers of Italy
Scooter manufacturers
Vehicle manufacturing companies established in 1909
Italian companies established in 1909
Italian brands
Province of Monza and Brianza
Engine manufacturers of Italy